Carsley may refer to:

People with the surname
George H. Carsley (1870-1933), American architect
Lee Carsley (1974), English football player

Location
Carsley, Virginia, U.S.